Teresa Ansúrez (died in 997) was the Queen consort of King Sancho I of León, and because of that, she is also known as Teresa of Leon. She was regent of her son in 975-979.

Consort
Teresa was a daughter of nobleman Ansur Fernández and Gontroda Nuñez and sister of Fernando Ansúrez II. She married Sancho I of León and by him had children, King Ramiro III of León and Urraca Sánchez.

Regent
Teresa was put in a convent on her husband's death, and her son placed under the regency of her sister-in-law, Elvira Ramírez. However, when a coalition formed by the latter suffered a military defeat at Gormaz in 975, Elvira was forced to step away from her active role in the government, and Teresa assumed the regency until her son achieved his majority.

References

Leonese queen consorts
997 deaths
10th-century women rulers
Year of birth unknown
Regents of León
Queen mothers